The Superman dynasty, an extension of the House of El, is a lineage of DC Comics superheroes. The term is used for the descendants of Kal-El, the original Superman, who continue to uphold his legacy of heroism well into the 853rd century, as depicted in the DC One Million crossover. Repeated references to members of the Superman dynasty as Superman's "descendants" and at least one reference to them as the "blood of his blood" would seem to indicate that they are, in fact the biological descendants of Superman in some fashion.

History

The Superman dynasty starts with the House of El, and Kal-El. Unable to save Krypton, Jor-El decides to send his only son to Earth. Under the yellow sun, Kal-El becomes the first super-powered Kryptonian known as Superman. Superman is later joined by Kon-El, a clone who would become known as Superboy. Kara Zor-El his cousin, who would become known as Supergirl, as well as Kara Zor-L, also known as Power Girl, the Earth-Two counterpart of Super-girl, and the Eradicator, an artificial intelligence created by Kem-L.

In the future timeline of DC One Million, the death of Lois Lane compels Superman to leave Earth and wander the universe alone at the end of the 21st century. This version of Kal-El is immortal and is unclear within the comics on how he acquired it. In his place, he leaves his heir, who is called Superman Secundus. From that point on, descendants of Superman continue to protect his adopted home world for centuries, with at least one Superman emerging in each generation. As time passes, and more sources of power are discovered, new superpowers are added to the inheritance of the Supermen. Among these powers are the ten alien sensory powers brought into the lineage by the marriage of the Superman of the 67th century and Gzntplzk, queen of the 5th dimension (home in the 20th century to Mister Mxyzptlk), including super-ESP. Their powers are increased significantly again at the dawn of the 700th century, when the original Superman finally returns from his wandering, takes up residence on Earth's sun, and enters into a pact with the Superman of that time to provide them access to the vast powers he had gained in the 68,000 years he had been gone, in return for the dynasty's vow to continue to protect Earth.

The members of the Superman dynasty continue to be at the forefront of super heroism for centuries, leading such groups as the Office of Deputy Superhunters in the 250th century, the Justice League of the Atom (sometime after the 364th), and Justice Legion Alpha in the 853rd. A number of Supermen from different eras, including the Superman of the 853rd century, also form a team called the Superman Squad which travels through time fighting threats to the timestream. Superman even joins the Pancosmic Justice Jihad, but soon leaves over "policy issues".

A notable victory of the dynasty and its allies is the defeat of the Bizarro plague in the 250th century, and the dynasty's greatest foe is Solaris, the Tyrant Sun.

The ongoing Rebirth storyline raises new important questions about the Superman Dynasty future timeline. It has been revealed that the "Convergence" versions of Clark Kent/Superman and Lois Lane are not alternate reality versions of the post-Flashpoint/New 52 versions, but were in fact the original pre-Flashpoint versions somehow moved - for as-yet unknown reasons - by Doctor Manhattan to a "pocket reality" of his creation for over a decade while he created the New 52 Universe. Both versions have recently been merged into a combined Superman and Lois Lane, whose new history seems to mirror the pre-Flashpoint continuity far more than that of the New 52. This raises the question of whether or not the Superman Dynasty timeline is now back in continuity in this reality. If so, then it is possible their half-human son Jonathan is the future "Superman Secondus" from which the rest of the Dynasty descends in the distant future. It's also equally likely that the Dynasty's timeline of the Rebirth reality is no longer the same as the one presented in DC One Million. The answers to these questions clearly remain for after the confrontation with Doctor Manhattan and all questions about his tampering with the DC Universe - particularly Superman - are answered.

House of El

Earth-Two
 Jor-L
 Kal-L/Clark Kent 
 Kara Zor-L: daughter of Zor-L and Allura In-Z). She arrived on Earth as a young woman after years spent traveling in suspended animation. On Earth, she adopted the human alias Karen Starr and became a superhero known as Power Girl. She survived Crisis on Infinite Earths but for many years she believed she was an Atlantean before she remembered the truth of her origins.
 Equinox: son of Kara Zor-L from a mystical pregnancy. He aged rapidly to adulthood and disappeared during the Zero Hour event.
 Devine: a clone of Kara Zor-L created by Doctor Sivana for Maxwell Lord.
 Zor-L

Earth-One
 Seg-El I: grandfather of Kal-El. He married Nimda An-Dor, and they had three sons: Jor-El II, Nim-El, and Zor-El. Their grandchildren were Kal-El, Kara Zor-El, and Don-El.
 Jor-El II: a Kryptonian scientist who accurately predicted the Destruction of Krypton, but he was not believed. He married Lara Lor-Van, daughter of Lor-Van and Lara Rok-Var, and they had one son: Kal-El. 
 Kal-El I
 Kal-El/Clark Kent
 Val-El
 Zim-El
 Nim-El: twin brother of Jor-El, uncle of Kal-El and Kara Zor-El, Superman's Pal, Jimmy Olsen #60 (April 1962). He marries Dondra Klu-Ta, and they have one son: Don-El.
 Don-El: the son of Nim-El and Dondra Klu-Ta.
 Zor-El: brother of Jor-El. He married Alura In-Zee, and they have one daughter, Kara Zor-El.
 Kalya Var-El: daughter of Var-El, the sister of Jor-El I and Zim-El, and the great-aunt of Superman and Supergirl. She married Nim-Zee, and they had three sons: Van-Zee, his twin Dik-Zee, and Gem-Zee. All three of her sons survived the Destruction of Krypton when Kandor was taken by Brainiac. 
 Van-Zee: Kandorian superhero "Nightwing", he married the Human woman Sylvia DeWitt and had twins: Lyle-Zee and Lili Van-Zee. 
 Gem-Zee: had two children, Thara and Rad-Zee. Thara Gem-Zee married Ak-Var, her uncle's sidekick, who was called "Flamebird".

Post-Crisis
 Jor-El: a Kryptonian scientist who accurately predicted the Destruction of Krypton, but he was not believed. He married Lara Lor-Van, and they had one son: Kal-El.
 Kal-El/Clark Kent 
 Kem-L: a distant ancestor of the modern House of El. He created the Eradicator.
 Seyg-El: father of Jor-El and Zor-El and the grandfather of Superman and Supergirl.
 Ter-El: father of Seyg-El and the grandfather of Jor-El and Zor-El, making him the great-grandfather of Superman and Supergirl. 
 Superboy: also called Kon-El and Conner Kent, is a Genomorph hybrid of Superman and Lex Luthor's DNA who resembles Kal-El and was created by Cadmus Labs.
 Match: a clone of Conner Kent.
 Seraph: a DNAngel created by Dr. Amanda Spence at Cadmus with DNA donated by an unknown African-American woman in Superboy (vol. 4) #88 (July 2001).
 Bizarro: an imperfect copy of Superman.
 Cir-El: also called Mia and Cheryl Kent, is a human overwritten with Superman's DNA, a hybrid created by Brainiac in Superman 10-Cent Adventure #1.
 Mon-El: adopted Daxamite son of Kal-El who was adopted in Superboy #89 (June 1961) and Legion of Super-Heroes (vol. 3) #61 and Superboy (vol. 3) #17.
 Christopher Kent: the adopted son of Kal-El and Lois Lane. He is the biological son of General Dru-Zod and Ursa. He first appeared in Action Comics #844 (December 2006).
 Kara Zor-El: superhero known as Supergirl. She is the daughter of Zor-El and Alura In-Ze.
 Zor-El: brother of Jor-El. He married Alura In-Ze, and they have one daughter: Kara Zor-El.
 Laurel Kent: a descendant of Superman from the thirtieth century. 
 Kent Shakespeare: a descendant of Superman from the thirtieth century.

Post-Flashpoint
 Jon Lane Kent: the son of Kal-El and Lois Lane in Teen Titans (vol. 3) Annual #2 (October 2013) part of the Forever Evil crossover event.
 Superboy: a clone created by Harvest and N.O.W.H.E.R.E. with DNA from Jon Lane Kent and an unknown donor in the New 52.
 Jonathan Samuel Kent: son of Superman and Lois Lane, born in Convergence: Superman #2 (July 2015) and Superboy in "DC Rebirth".

Alternate universes
 Adam Kent: son of Kal-El and Lois Lane in JLA: Created Equal (2000). Kal-El also becomes a sperm donor after all men of Earth except him and Lex Luthor are killed, and he fathers the entire meta human population of Earth.
 Bru-El: Valora's twin and Kal-El's younger brother, he is the son of Jor-El and Lara Lor-Van and appears in Superman: The Last Family of Krypton (October–December 2010).
 Valora: Bru-El's twin and Kal-el's younger sister, she is the daughter of Jor-El and Lara Lor-Van and appears in Superman: The Last Family of Krypton (October-December 2010). 
 Jon Kent: the son of Kal-El and Lois Lane in Son of Superman (2000).
 Bruce: son of Kal-El and Wonder Woman in Superman: Distant Fires (1998) and JLA: Act of God (2000).
 Zod-Ur: son of Kal-El and Wonder Woman in the Justice Lord's reality in Justice League Beyond 2.0 (Sept 2013).
 Kell-El: Ezekiel Kent and Superman-X, is a clone of Kal-El in the 41st century from Legion of Superheroes: The Man from the Edge of Tomorrow.
 Zod-El: brother of Jor-El in Superman: Earth One, Volume 3 (February 2015).
 Belinda Zee: called Superior Girl, is a Bizarro created from Kara Zor-El's DNA in Supergirl: Cosmic Adventures in the 8th Grade.
 Andromeda: Supra Girl, is a version of Kara Zor-El from another dimension in Supergirl Cosmic Adventures In The Eighth Grade #5 (June 2009).
 Carol Kent: daughter of Clark Kent and Lois Chaudhari in Superman: Secret Identity (2004).
 Jane Kent: daughter of Clark Kent and Lois Chaudhari in Superman: Secret Identity (2004).
 Clark Kent: grandson of Clark Kent and Lois Chaudhari in Superman: Secret Identity (2004).
 Perry Kent: grandson of Clark Kent and Lois Chaudhari in Superman: Secret Identity (2004).
 Jimmy Kent: grandson of Clark Kent and Lois Chaudhari in Superman: Secret Identity (2004).
 Brainac's Daughter/XTC: daughter of Kara Zor-El and Brainiac 5 in Kingdom Come (1996).
 Jonathan: son of Kal-El and Wonder Woman in The Kingdom (1999).
 Joel Kent: son of Clark Kent and Lois Lane in Superman & Batman: Generations (1999).
 Kara Kent: daughter of Clark Kent and Lois Lane in Superman & Batman: Generations (1999).
 Clark Wayne: Nightwing, is the son of Joel Kent and Mei-Lai Kent in Superman & Batman: Generations 2 (2001). He is adopted and raised by his stepfather, Bruce Wayne Jr. (the son of Bruce Wayne).
 Lois Wayne and Lara Wayne: Supergirl Red and Supergirl Blue, are the daughters of Clark Wayne and Amanda Mason in Superman & Batman: Generations 2 (2001).
 Thomas Taylor Wayne: son of Lara Wayne and Bruce Wayne Sr. Since Bruce is Lara's legal great-grandfather, Thomas is his own great-great-uncle in Superman & Batman: Generations 3 (2004).
 Lar-El and Vara: children of Kal-El and Beautiful Dreamer in Superman & Batman: Generations 3 (2004).
 Lara Kent: daughter of Kal-El and Wonder Woman in Batman: The Dark Knight Strikes Again.
 Jonathan Kent: son of Kal-El and Wonder Woman in Dark Knight III: The Master Race.
 Zorn-El: cousin of Kal-El from Batman: The Dark Knight Strikes Again.
 Jur-Li: villainous version of Jor-El from the Pre-Crisis Earth-Three. He has one son, Kel-Li.
 Kel-Li: villainous version of Superman from the Pre-Crisis Earth Three. He is Jur-Li's son.
 Jor-Il: villainous version of Jor-El from the Post-Flashpoint Earth 3. He married Lara, and they have one son: Kal-Il.
 Kal-Il: villainous version of Superman from the Post-Flashpoint Earth 3.
 Superlad: male version of Kara Zor-El on Earth-11 as seen in Superman/Batman #22-25 (October 2005) and Countdown Presents: The Search for Ray Palmer: Superwoman/Batwoman #1 (December 2007).
 Superwoman: female version of Clark Kent on Earth-11 as seen in Superman/Batman #22-25 (October 2005) and Countdown Presents: The Search for Ray Palmer: Superwoman/Batwoman #1 (December 2007).
 Jorel and Lara: scientists from the Kryptonian city Jandra-La on Vathlo Island on Earth-23. They are the parents of Kalel.
 Calvin Ellis: President of the United States on Earth 23 where he is also that universe's Superman. His birth name is Kalel. He is native to Vathlo Island on Krypton, as seen in Final Crisis #7 (March 2009) and Action Comics (vol. 2) #9 (July 2012).

Others
 Halk Kar: Kal-El's foster brother from planet Thoron—a Kryptonian colony world, which is in the same solar system as Krypton. He was the inspiration for the later character, Mon-El.
 Val-Zod: Superman II, is a Kryptonian sent to Earth by his unknown parents, who were member of the house of Zod.
 Sunshine Superman is a refugee from Vathlo Island and a member of the Love Syndicate of Dreamworld. His Kryptonian name is unknown.
 Knor-El: Ken Clarkson, is the brother of Kal-El in Superman #200 (October 1967)
 Superman Jr. and Batman Jr., sons created by Superman and Batman in the AI at the Fortress of Solitude and brought to life; they appear in the "Super-Sons" stories in 12 issues (between 1976 and 1980) of World's Finest Comics.
 Clark Jr, son of Kal-El and Lois Lane in Superman #192 (January 1967).
 Clark Jr, son of Kal-El and Lana Lang in Superman #404 (February 1985).
 Laney: Lanie, is the daughter of Kal-El and Lois Lane in Superman #215 (April 1969).
 Lara Lane-Kent: the daughter of Kal-El and Lois Lane in The Adventures of Superman #638 (May 2005).
 Larry and Carole - twin children of Kal-El and Lois Lane in Superman's Girl Friend Lois Lane #23 (February 1961) and Superman's Girl Friend Lois Lane #39 (February 1963).
 Laura Kent: daughter of Kal-El and Lois Lane in Superman Family #200 (April 1980).
 Lisa Kent: daughter of Kal-El and Lois Lane in Superman's Girl Friend Lois Lane #91.
 Lola Kent: daughter of Kal-El and Lois Lane in Superman's Pal Jimmy Olsen #56 (October 1961).
 Kal and Jor: children of Kal-El and Lana Lang in Superman #162 (July 1963) and Superman #166 (January 1964) and Superman: Distant Fires (1998) and Action Comics #492 (February 1979).
 Joan: daughter of Kal-El and Lana Lang in Superman's Girl Friend Lois Lane #46 (January 1964). She falls in love with Larry Luthor, the son of Lex Luthor and Lois Lane.
 Ariella Kent: daughter of Kal-El and Matrix from "Many Happy Returns", first seen in Supergirl One Million (1998).
 Vol: son of Kal-El and Lasil in Action Comics #370 (December 1968).
 Krys: son of Kal-El and Krysalla in Action Comics #410 (March 1972).
 C.K.: a descendant of Superman who became a member of the Superman Squad.
 Jorel Kent: son of Kal-El and Lois Lane. He succeeds his father as "Superman II", and he is succeeded by his own son Kalel as "Superman III".
 Kalel Kent: son of Jorel Kent and "Mrs Jorel Kent" in Superman #364-372 (October 1981-June 1982). He succeeds his father and grandfather as "Superman III".
 Laurel Kent: daughter of Clark Kent. She made her first appearance is in Superman #354 (December 1980)
 Dave Kent: son of Kalel Kent and Melodee Sellers.
 Superman V: son of Dave Kent. His first actual appearance is in Action Comics #338 (June 1966).
 Superman VI: son of Superman V.
 Superman VII: Kanton K-73, is the son of Superman VI from Action Comics #338 (June 1966).
 Klar Ken T5477: Superman XX, is the older brother of Kara. He was born in 2944 as a descendant of Superman's son Jorel Kent.
 Kara: called Supergirl XX, is the younger sister of Klar Ken. She is descended from Superman's son Jorel Kent and born in the thirtieth century.
 Justice Legion S: a superhero team from the 853rd Century in DC One Million which consists of one million clones of Superboy, all with different powers.
 Superman Secundus: a descendant of Superman who succeeded the original Superman after he left Earth. 
 Kal Kent: a descendant of Superman in DC One Million and the leader of Justice League Alpha. He is not only of Kryptonian descent since many aliens and otherworldly beings have married into the Superman Dynasty by the 853rd Century. Most notably, he descended from a princess of the Fifth Dimension.
 Super Lad: a male clone of Kara Zor-El as seen in Supergirl #10 (October 1974)
 Satan Girl: an evil double of Kara Zor-El created by Red Kryptonite in Adventure Comics #313 (October 1963).
 Louise-L: Supergirl of the 5020th Century. She is descended from Superman.
 Jonathan: the son of Kal-El and Lois Lane in Whatever Happened to the Man of Tomorrow? (September 1986).

House of Van
 Lor-Van: husband of Kela and the father of Lara and Zora.
 Kela: wife of Lor-Van and the mother of Zora and Lara. She was originally known as Lara Rok-Var during the Pre-Crisis Era, but her name was changed to Kela after Flashpoint. She survived the Destruction of Krypton because she was inside the city of Kandor when it was shrunken and removed from the planet.
 Lara Lor-Van: daughter of Lor-Van and Kela and the sister of Zora. Biological mother of Superman.
 Zora Lor-Van: daughter of Lor-Van and Kela and the sister of Lara. She survived the Destruction of Krypton because she was inside the city of Kandor when it was shrunken and removed from the planet. She is sometimes called Mara instead, and it is presently unknown which is meant to be her "real" name.
 Nara: grandmother of Lara Lor-Van. It is unknown whether she is her maternal or paternal grandmother.

House of Ze
 Alura In-Zee: wife of Zor-El and the mother of Kara Zor-El.
 On Earth-Two, Allura In-Z is the wife of Zor-L and the mother of Kara Zor-L, who was sent to Earth in a rocket like her cousin Kal-L. Allura and Zor-L were killed in the Destruction of Krypton.
 On Earth-One, Allura In-Ze survived the Destruction of Krypton with the other residents of Argo City, who were protected by the city's force field. She married Zor-El and had a daughter, Kara Zor-El. When Kara was fifteen, a meteor storm wrecked the force field, and the citizens were endangered by Kryptonite poisoning. Zor attempted to save them by creating a "Survival Zone", akin to the Phantom Zone, but when that apparently failed, Zor and Allura decided to send their daughter to Earth in a rocket. After Kara's departure, the Argoans began fading into the Phantom Zone instead of dying from radiation poisoning. Later, Kara rescues her parents from the Phantom Zone, and they shrink themselves down to settle in Kandor. When Kandor is restored to full size, Allura and Zor make their home on Rokyn where they continue to live up until their daughter dies during Crisis on Infinite Earths. Allura, Zor, and all the residents of Rokyn cease to exist after reality is rebooted by the Crisis.
 Alura In-Ze is reintroduced after Crisis on Infinite Earths as a member of the Krypton Science Council and a resident of the Bottle City of Kandor imprisoned on Brainiac's ship. Her nephew Kal-El rescues Kandor from Brainiac and restores it to full-size not far from his Fortress of Solitude where it becomes known as "New Krypton". Under Earth's yellow sun, Alura gains all the powers of the typical Kryptonian. Unlike her husband, she is not interested in assimilating, and she causes several problems for her daughter and nephew by acting in what she thinks are the best interests of the Kryptonians, not the least of which is kidnapping several of Superman's enemies from Stryker's Island and sending them to the Phantom Zone. Following Zor's death, she detaches New Krypton from Earth and puts into fixed orbit opposite Earth's, and she forbids Earthlings (including Kal) from setting foot on the new planet. She then frees the Phantom Zone prisoners. During the war between Earth and New Krypton, Alura is killed when New Krypton is destroyed by Reactron.
 Alura In-Ze is again reimagined after Flashpoint. In the Prime Universe, she survived Krypton's destruction with the other residents of Argo City, but she later died when their force field failed. She is survived by her daughter Kara, who is sent to Earth in a rocket and becomes Supergirl, and her husband Zor, who is turned into Cyborg Superman.
 General Astra is the identical twin sister of Alura In-Zee and the aunt of Kara Zor-El in Supergirl. She married her subordinate Non. Astra and Non believed that Krypton would be destroyed, and they attempted to prevent the destruction of their homeworld, resorting to violent measures, until Astra was tricked into meeting her niece Kara and was captured with her husband and followers. Astra was given a lifetime sentence in Fort Rozz. She therefore survived the Destruction of Krypton and was able to escape years later with the other prisoners of Fort Rozz. She then tried to take over Earth and fought against her niece Supergirl several times, but she gave orders that Kara was not to be injured. She was later killed by Kara's foster sister Alex Danvers during a fight with Martian Manhunter, and after her funeral and a period of mourning, her widower Non no longer respected her orders to protect Kara.

In other media
 Jason White, son of Clark Kent and Lois Lane in the 2006 film Superman Returns, raised by Perry White's son Richard White.
 LX-15 / Alex Luthor Jr. / Conner "CNR" Kent / Kon-El , a Cognitional Neuroplastic Replicant hybrid of Superman and Lex Luthor's DNA. He was raised by Tess Mercer in the TV series Smallville.
 Seyg-El (renamed Seg-El) appears in Krypton as the main protagonist and is the father and grandfather of Jor-El and Kal-El, respectively.
 Clark and Lois of Earth-167 (the setting of Smallville) have unnamed daughters in the Arrowverse's Crisis on Infinite Earths crossover. 
 In the DC Animated Universe, Kara In-Ze is not a blood relative of Kal-El but instead a survivor of Argo who was adopted by Jonathan and Martha Kent. Her biological parents were Kala and Zor, and her sisters were Kalya, Kori, and Kari. She also had a biological uncle, Del Im-Re, and a cousin named Dar Im-Re.
 Galatea, a clone of Kara In-Ze created by Emil Hamilton for Project Cadmus, appears in Justice League Unlimited.

References

External links
 House of El
 Family Tree of Superman

Kryptonians
Fictional families
Dynasty